John Burch may refer to:

Musicians
John Burch (musician) (1932–2006), English pianist and composer
John Burch, Bermudan guitarist for The Invaders

Politics and military
John Burch (before 1635–after 1661), English military officer and Speaker of the House of Assembly of Barbados
John Burch (before 1808–after 1833), American member of the 56th New York State Legislature 
John Chilton Burch (1826–1885), American legislator
John Christopher Burch (1827–1881), Secretary of the US Senate

Others
John Burch (settler) (1741–1797), early settler of Chippawa, Ontario
 John B. Burch, American zoologist
 John E. Burch (1896–1969), American producer and director
John Burch (born 1966), American football player for the 1989 Phoenix Cardinals season
John Burch, producer for a film about molecular assembler nanofactories
John Burch, American owner of companies that built Merlin aircraft

See also
John Birch (disambiguation)
John Burch House, part of the Quaker Hill Historic District (Waterford, Connecticut)
Burch (surname)